Vardit Ravitsky is a bioethicist, researcher, and author. She is a full professor at the University of Montreal and a senior lecturer on Global Health and Social Medicine at Harvard Medical School. She is immediate-past president and current vice-president of the International Association of Bioethics, and the director of Ethics and Health at the Center for Research on Ethics. She is a Fellow of the Pierre Elliott Trudeau Foundation, where she Chaired the COVID-19 Impact Committee. She is also Fellow of The Hastings Center and of the Canadian Academy of Health Sciences.

Ravitsky has published over 200 research articles and commentaries in bioethics, with a focus on the ethical, social, and policy implications of genomics and reproductive technologies. She leads several research projects, funded by the National Institutes of Health and by Canada's national and provincial funding agencies, and has been awarded a McConnell-University of Montreal Research Chair. She is lead editor of the Penn Center Guide to Bioethics.

Education
Ravitsky holds a bachelor's degree in philosophy from the Sorbonne University in Paris, France and a master's degree in philosophy from the University of New Mexico in Albuquerque, USA. In 2004, she completed her Ph.D. in philosophy with a specialization in Bioethics at Bar-Ilan University in Israel. From 2003 to 2005 Ravitsky was a Post-Doctoral Fellow at the Department of Clinical Bioethics of the National Institutes of Health and at the Social and Behavioral Research Branch of the National Human Genome Research Institute in Bethesda, Maryland, USA.

Career
Ravitsky was a researcher at the Unit for Health Rights and Ethics of the Gertner Institute for Epidemiology and Health Policy Research in Israel (2001-2003). In 2005, she accepted a position as assistant professor at Department of Medical Ethics in the School of Medicine of the University of Pennsylvania. In 2009, she joined the University of Montreal as an assistant professor. She was promoted to associate professor in 2014 and to Full Professor in 2020.

Ravitsky served as a Consultant to Genome Canada (2006-2008), assisting in the development of its GE3LS research program (Genomics and its ethical, environmental, economic, legal, and social implications). From 2008 to 2009 she was Senior Policy Advisor at the Ethics Office of the Canadian Institutes of Health Research (CIHR). In 2018, she was appointed board member of the Canadian Philosophical Association and member of the Genomics & Society Working Group  of the National Human Genome Research Institute (NHGRI). In 2020, she was featured  by Genome Canada as a leading Canadian researcher in the area of ethical, social, and policy implications of genomics.

Research
Ravitsky's research focuses on reproductive ethics and the ethics of genetics and genomics, often targeting new and potentially disruptive technologies. She has studied the implications of emerging biotechnologies for women's reproductive autonomy, patients’ lived experiences, disability rights, and the governance needed to address ethical challenges in these areas. Her research also addresses societal and cultural dimensions of bioethical dilemmas and health policy.

Ravitsky's research is published in academic bioethics journals, as well as clinical journals. Her work explores subjects such as Non-Invasive Prenatal Testing (NIPT), In-Vitro Fertilization (IVF) and pre-implantation genetic testing (PGT), germline gene editing, mitochondrial replacement therapy, gamete donation, epigenetics, the status of frozen embryos, posthumous reproduction, and public health approaches to infertility.

Donor conception 
Ravitsky has written about the potential medical and psycho-social issues facing individuals born from gamete (sperm and egg) donation. She argued that their interests to have access to information about their genetic origins should be recognized. She also explored the implications of these interests in the context of cross-border assisted reproduction, where gametes and prospective parents may come from different countries.

Infertility and assisted reproductive technologies 
Ravitsky's research explores various aspects of assisted reproductive technologies (ART). She studied the need for a public health approach to infertility prevention, particularly in the context of advanced maternal age and in the area of male infertility. She analyzed ethical issues related to fertility preservation in pediatric cancer patients, such as prepubescent girls and adolescents. She also studied issues related to post-humous reproduction, such as consent to the use of leftover embryos from In-Vitro Fertilization (IVF) or factors influencing decision-making regarding the post-humous use of sperm. She studied ethical issues related to access to IVF of women with mental illness and to possible epigenetic risks of IVF.

Prenatal testing  
In 2009, Ravitsky started exploring the socio-ethical aspects of Non-Invasive Prenatal Testing (NIPT), also known as prenatal cell-free DNA testing. She published a paper in Nature Reviews Genetics, arguing that NIPT ought to be implemented without delay due to its potential benefit for pregnant women. In 2011, she participated in the first international workshop on the ethics of NIPT and in 2015 she co-organized an international workshop, exploring NIPT in the Non-Western Context, as well as a workshop at the International Society for Prenatal Diagnosis‘ International Conference, in which patients’ advocates discussed the impact of NIPT on their families and communities.

Since 2013, Ravitsky has co-led the pan-Canadian research project PEGASUS that explores the responsible implementation of NIPT in the Canadian context. She leads a team of researchers studying the ethical, social, and policy issues associated with NIPT, with a focus on the reproductive autonomy of pregnant people and the need to address disability rights when implementing a new prenatal testing technology. She published extensively on these topics. In 2017, she published a paper proposing a conceptual framework for the ethical analysis of NIPT, based on the tension between women's reproductive autonomy and a public health approach to prenatal testing. In 2021 she led the publication of a paper on the emergence and global spread of NIPT.

Genetics and genomics 
Ravitsky has explored various ethical and legal challenges associated with genetic research and genomics-based technologies. In 2006, she published a paper proposing a framework for the disclosure of individual genetic results to research participants. The paper was selected by Essential Science Indicators from Thomson Reuters as the most-cited paper of 2016 in the research area of Social Sciences. It was also named one of the top 5 most cited papers ever published by the American Journal of Bioethics.

She wrote about the ethical and conceptual challenges emerging from epigenetics and about the clinical implementation of Preimplantation Genetic Testing. Her research addresses ethical and policy issues emerging from germline gene editing and mitochondrial replacement therapy. She is member of a group that has explored the need to revise Canadian policy, in particular Canada's 2004 Assisted Human Reproduction Act, to allow research on human embryos using these technologies. In 2022, Ravitsky won competitive NIH grants to co-lead the ethics module of 2 large data-generation projects (one on cell mapping and the other on voice as a biomarker), funded within the Bridge2AI program that seeks to promote health research based on Artificial Intelligence and Machine Learning.

End of life and cultural perspectives
In 2000, Ravitsky was appointed by the Israeli Minister of Health to an expert committee tasked with drafting legislation that would address end-of-life care of dying patients in Israel. The work of the committee resulted in the Dying Patient Law of 2005, that Ravitsky translated to English and has written several papers about. Her work explores the Jewish cultural approach to end-of-life care and the way in which cultural values shape bioethical and policy debates in various societies. She also wrote about the role culture plays in the context of genomics, for example in relation to cloning and gene editing.

Impact on policy making 
In 2015, Ravitsky was invited to write a background paper for the Nuffield Council on Bioethics on the key clinical, ethical, social, legal and policy issues associated with Non-Invasive Prenatal Testing (NIPT), based on which the Council developed a project to explore the topic, resulting in a report. She was also invited to write a paper on the ethical aspects of implementing NIPT for the UK government's National Screening Committee. In 2016 she was invited to present to the Quebec National Assembly regarding ethical aspects of gene editing, and in 2017 she was invited to join an expert group convened by Quebec's Commission on Ethics in Science and Technology to write guidelines on germline gene editing.

Work during COVID-19
During the COVID-19 global pandemic, Ravitsky supported the work of clinical ethicists in the healthcare system and gave hundreds of media interviews to enhance trust in public health measures, including COVID vaccines. In 2020, she was appointed by the Pierre Elliott Trudeau Foundation as Chair of its COVID-19 Impact Committee, where she oversaw the publication of 16 op-eds in national newspapers, designed to inform public debate about the social challenges of the pandemic. The committee produced a declaration and a podcast series. In 2022, she received a public outreach award from the University of Montreal for her work.

Media and public outreach 
Ravitsky has given over 400 interviews in print media, radio, TV, and podcasts. She has appeared in radio shows such as The Current and Quirks and Quarks, and in TV shows such as Enquête, Découverte, and Netflix's A User's Guide to Cheating Death. She has written numerous opinion articles for the popular press including CNN Opinion, the Globe and Mail, the National Post, the Toronto Star, Policy Options and Psychology Today.

On January 12, 2022, in an interview with CBC news, Ravitsky made controversial statements about the unvaccinated saying that according to some government approaches, "they should not have the right to circulate freely in society."

Awards and honors
2017 - Researcher Knowledge Mobilization Award, Quebec Reproduction Network
2018 - Board member, Canadian Philosophical Association (CPA)
2020 – Fellow of the Canadian Academy of Health Sciences
2020 – Chair of the COVID-19 Impact Committee, Pierre Elliott Trudeau Foundation
2020 – Fellow of the Pierre Elliott Trudeau Foundation
2020 – Fellow of the Hastings Center

Bibliography

Books
Public Discourse on Agri-Biotech and GMO in Israel (2003)
The Penn Center Guide to Bioethics. (2009)

Selected articles
Vardit Ravitsky & Marie-Christine Roy (first authors), Hazar Haidar, Lidewij Henneman, John Marshall, Ainsley J. Newson, Olivia M.Y. Ngan, & Tamar Nov-Klaiman. The emergence and global spread of non-Invasive Prenatal Testing. Annual Review of Genomics and Human Genetics, 22(1), 309-338, 2021.
I. Glenn Cohen, Eli Y. Adashi & Vardit Ravitsky. "How bans on germline editing deprive patients with mitochondrial disease". Nature Biotechnology 37: 589–592, 2019. 
Vardit Ravitsky. "The Shifting Landscape of Prenatal Testing: Between Reproductive Autonomy and Public Health". Hastings Center Report, 47 (6): S34-S40. Nov-Dec 2017.
Ravitsky Vardit. "'Knowing where you come from': The Rights of Donor-Conceived Individuals and the Meaning of Genetic Relatedness". Minnesota Journal of Law Science & Technology, 11(2): 655–684. 2010.
Ravitsky Vardit & Wilfond Benjamin S. "Disclosing Individual Genetic Results to Research Participants". American Journal of Bioethics - Target Article. Nov-Dec; 6(6): pp. 8–17. 2006.
Ravitsky Vardit. "Timers on Ventilators". British Medical Journal, Vol. 330, pp. 415–417. 2005

References

External links 

Living people
Israeli Canadian
Academic staff of the Université de Montréal
Bar-Ilan University alumni
University of New Mexico alumni
Year of birth missing (living people)
Harvard Medical School faculty
Hastings Center Fellows